The Skulls III is a 2004 thriller film, directed by J. Miles Dale and starring Clare Kramer, Bryce Johnson, Steve Braun, and Barry Bostwick. It is a sequel to the 2002 film The Skulls II and the third and final installment of The Skulls film series.

Cast 
 Clare Kramer as Taylor Brooks
 Bryce Johnson as Roger Lloyd
 Barry Bostwick as Nathan Lloyd
 Steve Braun as Brian Kelly
 Karl Pruner as Martin Brooks
 Dean McDermott as Det. Staynor
 Maria del Mar as Det. Valdez
 Len Cariou as Dean Lawton
 Brooke D'Orsay as Veronica Bell
 Shaun Sipos as Ethan Rawlings
 Chris Trussell as Conrad
 David Purchase as Killebrew
 Toby Proctor as  Sam Brooks
 Martha Burns as Swim Coach
 Alison Sealy-Smith as Dr. Franks
 Philip Akin as Captain Harlan
 John Bayliss as Minister
 Irene Dale as Librarian
 Jonathan Duncap as Priest

Reception

Accolades

References

External links
 
 

2004 films
Fictional secret societies
Films about secret societies
Skull and Bones Society
Films scored by Christophe Beck
2004 thriller films
Original Film films
Direct-to-video sequel films
Universal Pictures direct-to-video films
Films set in 2003
2000s English-language films